Sapanlı can refer to:

 Sapanlı, Güdül
 Sapanlı, Narman
 Sapanlı, Nusaybin